Wyoming Highway 222 (WYO 222) is a  Wyoming State Road known as Fort Access Road located in Laramie County, on the western edge of Cheyenne.

Route description
At  WYO 222 intersects Wyoming Highway 210 (Happy Jack Road), its northern terminus at the southwest corner of F.E. Warren Air Force Base.

History
Highway 222 was originally 8.29 miles long and traveled from WYO 225 north to WYO 211. The segment of WYO 222 north of Highway 210 to Highway 211 has since been decommissioned.

Major intersections

See also

 List of state highways in Wyoming
 List of highways numbered 222

References

External links 

 Cheyenne @ AARoads.com
 Wyoming State Routes 200-299
 WYO 222 - WYO 225 to I-80/US 30
 WYO 222 - I-80/US 30 to WYO 210
 WYO 222 - WYO 210 to Warren AFB

222
Transportation in Laramie County, Wyoming
222